Western Downs refers to two incarnations of an electoral district of the Legislative Assembly in the Australian state of Queensland, based in the western part of the Darling Downs.

The original district existed from 1860 to 1873 and elected two members. More recently, Western Downs was a single member electorate that was first contested in 1992 and abolished in 2001.

Members for Western Downs

Results

See also
 Electoral districts of Queensland
 Members of the Queensland Legislative Assembly by year
 :Category:Members of the Queensland Legislative Assembly by name

References

Former electoral districts of Queensland